William Mellish is the name of:

 William Mellish (died 1791) (c. 1710–1791), British government administrator and Member of Parliament
 William Mellish (victualler) (c. 1763–1834), English businessman
 William Mellish (banker) (c. 1764–1838), English politician, banker and Governor of the Bank of England, son of the above
 William Mellish (cricketer) (1810–1864)